Edward Potkowski (10 May 1934 in Rybnik - 31 July 2017) was a Polish historian. His specialization includes history of the medieval period and paleography.

Edward Potkowski was born on 10 May 1934 in Rybnik. In 1954 he enrolled at the Uniwersytet Wrocławski, but since 1955 he had been studied on the Warsaw University. He graduated in 1960. Potkowski gained PhD in 1967. His supervisor was Tadeusz Manteuffel. In 1979 he passed his habilitation. From 1981 to 1986 he was a director of Central Archives of Historical Records.

In 1989 he gained the title of professor.

In 1960 he married Zofia Cep.

Publications 
 Książka rękopiśmienna w kulturze Polski średniowiecznej (1984). 
 Le Livre manuscrit – la société – la culture dans la Pologne du bas moyen âge (XIVe-XVe s.) (1997). 
 Książka i pismo w średniowieczu. Studia z dziejów kultury piśmiennej i komunikacji społecznej (2006). 
 Dziedzictwo wierzeń pogańskich w średniowiecznych Niemczech. Defuncti vivi (1973). 
 Crécy - Orlean 1346-1429 (1986)
 Warna 1444 (1990)
 Grunwald 1410 (1994)
 Zakony rycerskie (1995, 2005). 
 Heretycy i inkwizytorzy (2012).

References

Further reading 
J. Kaliszuk, Bibliografia prac prof. dr hab. Edwarda Potkowskiego. In: E scientia et amicitia. Studia poświęcone profesorowi Edwardowi Potkowskiemu, ed. M. Drzewiecki (1999).

20th-century Polish historians
Polish male non-fiction writers
1934 births
Polish medievalists
2017 deaths